Dustin Brown and Donald Young were the defending champions but chose not to defend their title.

Andrea Pellegrino and Mario Vilella Martínez won the title after defeating Luca Margaroli and Andrea Vavassori 7–6(7–1), 3–6, [12–10] in the final.

Seeds

Draw

References

External links
 Main draw

BNP Paribas de Nouvelle-Calédonie - Doubles
2020 Doubles